The free energy principle is a mathematical principle in biophysics and cognitive science (especially Bayesian approaches to brain function, but also some approaches to artificial intelligence). It describes a formal account of the representational capacities of physical systems: that is, why things that exist look as if they track properties of the systems to which they are coupled. It establishes that the dynamics of physical systems minimise a quantity known as surprisal (which is just the negative log probability of some outcome); or equivalently, its variational upper bound, called free energy. The principle is formally related to variational Bayesian methods and was originally introduced by Karl Friston as an explanation for embodied perception-action loops in neuroscience, where it is also known as active inference.

The free energy principle models the behaviour of systems that are distinct from, but coupled to, another system (e.g., an embedding environment), where the degrees of freedom that implement the interface between the two systems is known as a Markov blanket. More formally, the free energy principle says that if a system has a "particular partition" (i.e., into particles, with their Markov blankets), then subsets of that system will track the statistical structure of other subsets (which are known as internal and external states or paths of a system). 

The free energy principle is based on the Bayesian idea of the brain as an “inference engine.” Under the free energy principle, systems pursue paths of least surprise, or equivalently, minimize the difference between predictions based on their model of the world and their sense and associated perception. This difference is quantified by variational free energy and is minimized by continuous correction of the world model of the system, or by making the world more like the predictions of the system. By actively changing the world to make it closer to the expected state, systems can also minimize the free energy of the system. Friston assumes this to be the principle of all biological reaction. Friston also believes his principle applies to mental disorders as well as to artificial intelligence. AI implementations based on the active inference principle have shown advantages over other methods. Although challenging even for experts, the free energy principle is ultimately quite simple and fundamental, and can be re-derived from conventional mathematics following maximum entropy inference. Indeed, it can be shown that any large enough random dynamical system will display the kind of boundary that allows one to apply the free energy principle to model its dynamics: the probability of finding a Markov blanket in the underlying potential of the system (and therefore, being able to apply the free energy principle) goes to 100% as the size of the system goes to infinity. 

The free energy principle is a mathematical principle of information physics: much like the principle of maximum entropy or the principle of least action, it is true on mathematical grounds. To attempt to falsify the free energy principle is a category mistake, akin to trying to falsify calculus by making empirical observations. (One cannot invalidate a mathematical theory in this way; instead, one would need to derive a formal contradiction from the theory.) In a 2018 interview, Friston explained what it entails for the free energy principle to not be subject to falsification: "I think it is useful to make a fundamental distinction at this point—that we can appeal to later. The distinction is between a state and process theory; i.e., the difference between a normative principle that things may or may not conform to, and a process theory or hypothesis about how that principle is realized. Under this distinction, the free energy principle stands in stark distinction to things like predictive coding and the Bayesian brain hypothesis. This is because the free energy principle is what it is — a principle. Like Hamilton's principle of stationary action, it cannot be falsified. It cannot be disproven. In fact, there’s not much you can do with it, unless you ask whether measurable systems conform to the principle. On the other hand, hypotheses that the brain performs some form of Bayesian inference or predictive coding are what they are—hypotheses. These hypotheses may or may not be supported by empirical evidence." There are many examples of these hypotheses being supported by empirical evidence.

Background 

The notion that self-organising biological systems – like a cell or brain – can be understood as minimising variational free energy is based upon Helmholtz’s work on unconscious inference  and subsequent treatments in psychology and machine learning. Variational free energy is a function of observations and a probability density over their hidden causes. This variational density is defined in relation to a probabilistic model that generates predicted observations from hypothesized causes. In this setting, free energy provides an approximation to Bayesian model evidence. Therefore, its minimisation can be seen as a Bayesian inference process. When a system actively makes observations to minimise free energy, it implicitly performs active inference and maximises the evidence for its model of the world.

However, free energy is also an upper bound on the self-information of outcomes, where the long-term average of surprise is entropy. This means that if a system acts to minimise free energy, it will implicitly place an upper bound on the entropy of the outcomes – or sensory states – it samples.

Relationship to other theories 

Active inference is closely related to the good regulator theorem and related accounts of self-organisation, such as self-assembly, pattern formation, autopoiesis and practopoiesis. It addresses the themes considered in cybernetics, synergetics and embodied cognition. Because free energy can be expressed as the expected energy of observations under the variational density minus its entropy, it is also related to the maximum entropy principle. Finally, because the time average of energy is action, the principle of minimum variational free energy is a principle of least action.

Action and perception 

Active inference applies the techniques of approximate Bayesian inference to infer the causes of sensory data from a 'generative' model of how that data is caused and then uses these inferences to guide action.
Bayes' rule characterizes the probabilistically optimal inversion of such a causal model, but applying it is typically computationally intractable, leading to the use of approximate methods.
In active inference, the leading class of such approximate methods are variational methods, for both practical and theoretical reasons: practical, as they often lead to simple inference procedures; and theoretical, because they are related to fundamental physical principles, as discussed above.

These variational methods proceed by minimizing an upper bound on the divergence between the Bayes-optimal inference (or 'posterior') and its approximation according to the method.
This upper bound is known as the free energy, and we can accordingly characterize perception as the minimization of the free energy with respect to inbound sensory information, and action as the minimization of the same free energy with respect to outbound action information.
This holistic dual optimization is characteristic of active inference, and the free energy principle is the hypothesis that all systems which perceive and act can be characterized in this way.

In order to exemplify the mechanics of active inference via the free energy principle, a generative model must be specified, and this typically involves a collection of probability density functions which together characterize the causal model.
One such specification is as follows.
The system is modelled as inhabiting a state space , in the sense that its states form the points of this space.

The generative model is then the specification of the following density functions:
 a stochastic model of the environmental dynamics, often written , characterizing how the external states are expected by the agent to evolve over time , given the agent's actions;
 an action model, written , characterizing how the agent's actions depend upon its internal states and sensory data; and
 an internal model, written , characterizing how the agent's internal states depend upon its sensory data.

These density functions determine the factors of a "joint model", which represents the complete specification of the generative model, and which can be written as
 .
Bayes' rule then determines the "posterior density" , which expresses a probabilistically-optimal belief about the external state  given the preceding state and the agent's actions, sensory signals, and internal states.
One then defines the free energy as
 
and defines action and perception as the joint optimization problem
 
 
Note that the free energy is also an upper bound on a measure of the agent's (marginal, or average) sensory surprise, and hence free energy minimization is often motivated by the minimization of surprise.

Free energy minimisation

Free energy minimisation and self-organisation 

Free energy minimisation has been proposed as a hallmark of self-organising systems when cast as random dynamical systems. This formulation rests on a Markov blanket (comprising action and sensory states) that separates internal and external states. If internal states and action minimise free energy, then they place an upper bound on the entropy of sensory states:

 

This is because – under ergodic assumptions – the long-term average of surprise is entropy. This bound resists a natural tendency to disorder – of the sort associated with the second law of thermodynamics and the fluctuation theorem. However, formulating a unifying principle for the life sciences in terms of concepts from statistical physics, such as random dynamical system, non-equilibrium steady state and ergodicity, places substantial constraints on the theoretical and empirical study of biological systems with the risk of obscuring all features that make biological systems interesting kinds of self-organizing systems.

Free energy minimisation and Bayesian inference 

All Bayesian inference can be cast in terms of free energy minimisation. When free energy is minimised with respect to internal states, the Kullback–Leibler divergence between the variational and posterior density over hidden states is minimised. This corresponds to approximate Bayesian inference – when the form of the variational density is fixed – and exact Bayesian inference otherwise. Free energy minimisation therefore provides a generic description of Bayesian inference and filtering (e.g., Kalman filtering). It is also used in Bayesian model selection, where free energy can be usefully decomposed into complexity and accuracy:

 
 
Models with minimum free energy provide an accurate explanation of data, under complexity costs (c.f., Occam's razor and more formal treatments of computational costs). Here, complexity is the divergence between the variational density and prior beliefs about hidden states (i.e., the effective degrees of freedom used to explain the data).

Free energy minimisation and thermodynamics 

Variational free energy is an information-theoretic functional and is distinct from thermodynamic (Helmholtz) free energy. However, the complexity term of variational free energy shares the same fixed point as Helmholtz free energy (under the assumption the system is thermodynamically closed but not isolated). This is because if sensory perturbations are suspended (for a suitably long period of time), complexity is minimised (because accuracy can be neglected). At this point, the system is at equilibrium and internal states minimise Helmholtz free energy, by the principle of minimum energy.

Free energy minimisation and information theory 

Free energy minimisation is equivalent to maximising the mutual information between sensory states and internal states that parameterise the variational density (for a fixed entropy variational density). This relates free energy minimization to the principle of minimum redundancy

Free energy minimisation in neuroscience 

Free energy minimisation provides a useful way to formulate normative (Bayes optimal) models of neuronal inference and learning under uncertainty and therefore subscribes to the Bayesian brain hypothesis. The neuronal processes described by free energy minimisation depend on the nature of hidden states:  that can comprise time-dependent variables, time-invariant parameters and the precision (inverse variance or temperature) of random fluctuations. Minimising variables, parameters, and precision correspond to inference, learning, and the encoding of uncertainty, respectively.

Perceptual inference and categorisation 

Free energy minimisation formalises the notion of unconscious inference in perception and provides a normative (Bayesian) theory of neuronal processing. The associated process theory of neuronal dynamics is based on minimising free energy through gradient descent.

 

Usually, the generative models that define free energy are non-linear and hierarchical (like cortical hierarchies in the brain). Special cases of generalised filtering include Kalman filtering, which is formally equivalent to predictive coding – a popular metaphor for message passing in the brain. Under hierarchical models, predictive coding involves the recurrent exchange of ascending (bottom-up) prediction errors and descending (top-down) predictions that is consistent with the anatomy and physiology of sensory and motor systems.

Perceptual learning and memory 

In predictive coding, optimising model parameters through a gradient descent on the time integral of free energy (free action) reduces to associative or Hebbian plasticity and is associated with synaptic plasticity in the brain.

Perceptual precision, attention and salience 

Optimizing the precision parameters corresponds to optimizing the gain of prediction errors (c.f., Kalman gain). In neuronally plausible implementations of predictive coding, this corresponds to optimizing the excitability of superficial pyramidal cells and has been interpreted in terms of attentional gain.

Concerning the top-down vs bottom-up controversy that has been addressed as a major open problem of attention, a computational model has succeeded in illustrating the circulatory nature of reciprocation between top-down and bottom-up mechanisms. Using an established emergent model of attention, namely, SAIM, the authors suggested a model called PE-SAIM that – in contrast to the standard version – approaches the selective attention from a top-down stance. The model takes into account the forwarding prediction errors sent to the same level or a level above to minimize the energy function indicating the difference between data and its cause or – in other words – between the generative model and posterior. To enhance validity, they also incorporated the neural competition between the stimuli in their model. A notable feature of this model is the reformulation of the free energy function only in terms of prediction errors during the task performance:
 

Comparing the two models reveals a notable similarity between their respective results while also highlighting a remarkable discrepancy, whereby – in the standard version of the SAIM – the model's focus is mainly upon the excitatory connections, whereas in the PE-SAIM, the inhibitory connections are leveraged to make an inference. The model has also proved to be fit to predict the EEG and fMRI data drawn from human experiments with high precision. In the same vein, Yahya et al. also applied the free energy principle to propose a computational model for template matching in covert selective visual attention that mostly relies on SAIM. According to this study, the total free energy of the whole state-space is reached by inserting top-down signals in the original neural networks, whereby we derive a dynamical system comprising both feed-forward and backward prediction error.

Active inference 

When gradient descent is applied to action , motor control can be understood in terms of classical reflex arcs that are engaged by descending (corticospinal) predictions. This provides a formalism that generalizes the equilibrium point solution – to the degrees of freedom problem – to movement trajectories.

Active inference and optimal control 

Active inference is related to optimal control by replacing value or cost-to-go functions with prior beliefs about state transitions or flow. This exploits the close connection between Bayesian filtering and the solution to the Bellman equation. However, active inference starts with (priors over) flow  that are specified with scalar   and vector  value functions of state space (c.f., the Helmholtz decomposition). The priors over flow  induce a prior over states  that is the solution to the appropriate forward Kolmogorov equations. In contrast, optimal control optimises the flow, given a cost function, under the assumption that  (i.e., the flow is curl free or has detailed balance). Usually, this entails solving backward Kolmogorov equations.

Active inference and optimal decision (game) theory 

Optimal decision problems (usually formulated as partially observable Markov decision processes) are treated within active inference by absorbing  utility functions into prior beliefs. In this setting, states that have a high utility (low cost) are states an agent expects to occupy. By equipping the generative model with hidden states that model control, policies (control sequences) that minimise variational free energy lead to high utility states.
 
Neurobiologically, neuromodulators such as dopamine are considered to report the precision of prediction errors by modulating the gain of principal cells encoding prediction error. This is closely related to – but formally distinct from – the role of dopamine in reporting prediction errors per se and related computational accounts.

Active inference and cognitive neuroscience 

Active inference has been used to address a range of issues in cognitive neuroscience, brain function and neuropsychiatry, including action observation, mirror neurons, saccades and visual search, eye movements, sleep, illusions, attention, action selection, consciousness, hysteria and psychosis. Explanations of action in active inference often depend on the idea that the brain has 'stubborn predictions' that it cannot update, leading to actions that cause these predictions to come true.

See also

References

External links 
 Behavioral and Brain Sciences (by Andy Clark)

Biological systems
Systems theory
Computational neuroscience
Mathematical and theoretical biology